Quinan may refer to:

Quinan, Nova Scotia, Canada
Edward Quinan (1885 – 1960), British Army commander
K. B. Quinan (1878 – 1948), American chemical engineer
Lloyd Quinan (born 1957), Scottish broadcaster and politician